is a Japanese anime television series made to promote Takara Tomy's long-running Tomica toyline of miniature toy cars. It replaced Kamiwaza Wanda and aired Saturday mornings at 7:00 am on the new hour-long Anisata block on TBS and affiliated stations. The original series aired from April 15, 2017 to December 23 of the same year, while 2018 featured a monthly 8 episode follow-up. A feature film was released a week later, tying it in with its concurrently airing successor series, Shinkansen Henkei Robo Shinkalion, with main character Hayato Hayasugi crossing over with the E5 Hayabusa.

Plot
In the near future, to cope with various incidents and disasters as well as crime, the Mobile Rescue Police developed the Drive Head, which transforms from a vehicle form to the robotic Walker Vehicle form. Gō Kurumada, the son of the Drive Head's developer, was discovered to be a suitable driver for Drive Head 01 Sonic Interceptor. He and the other children who were selected must bravely stand up to face incidents and disasters.

Characters

Team Drive Head 

The protagonist. A 5th grader who is the driver of Drive Head 01 Sonic Interceptor. After the frame is damaged in the 11th episode, it is upgraded to Drive Head 01 Mk-II Cyclone Interceptor. His father and grandfather were involved in the development of the Drive Head. Gō is always an optimistic person. Although he can be frivolous and likes to do things his own way, he is genuinely friendly. He has a photographic memory and can instantly burn images of what he sees into his mind. This helps him conduct rescues during disasters. He is forbidden from revealing the secret that he is a driver to his friends, which he is unhappy about. His favorite food is curry.

Gō's rival. A 5th grader who is the driver of Drive Head 02 Rescue Backdraft. It is upgraded to Drive Head 02 Mk-II Brave Backdraft in the 23rd episode, to increase its heat resistance. During the web series, it is upgraded to Drive Head 02 Mk-III Master Backdraft, which has increased power and speed, as well as a flight unit. Taiga is a talented athlete, and also plays the piano. At first he wouldn't talk much to Gō and the other drivers, but became a close friend over time. At school, he is very popular with girls. Commander Saionji is his uncle.

Mikoto's twin brother. A 5th grader who is the co-driver of Drive Head 03 White Hope, which he and his sister share. It is upgraded to Drive Head 03 Mk-II White Crystal Hope in the 22nd episode. He is introverted and a gentle person who dislikes conflict. He and his sister were both influenced by their parents, who are doctors working overseas. He has a crush on Sala Manda, an idol singer.

Jin's twin sister. A 5th grader who is the co-driver of Drive Head 03 White Hope, which she and her brother share. It is upgraded to Drive Head 03 Mk-II White Crystal Hope in the 22nd episode. During the web series, Mikoto gets a personal Drive Head, Drive Head 03 Mk-II White Pearl Hope. She is quite feminine and is popular in school. She is daring as well as assertive. Mikoto, as well as Jin, has great mathematical ability. Her favorite food is pancakes.

Mobile Rescue Police Staff 

Gō's father and the Chief Engineer to the Mobile Rescue Police. He took over development of the Drive Head project after the death of his father, Jōtarō. He has been close friends with Commander Saionji since they were in school. He also has ties with Karigari, who holds a grudge on him. Jō is crazy about dams, and goes annually to watch a dam's discharge. He has a wife, Kumiko, who is not affiliated with the Mobile Rescue Police.

Commander of the Mobile Rescue Police. He is Taiga's uncle. No matter the disaster or incident, he handles the case calmly, leading the rescue work.

The Chief to Team Drive Head, who drives the Transporter and gives instructions while on the scene of a rescue. She controls the Support Vehicles remotely. She later becomes the primary driver of Transporter Gaia and assists in rescues more directly. She grew up on an island, where her grandmother, Sanae, currently lives.

An operator. She also works as a counselor at Gō's school. If the drivers miss class because they have to launch, she makes them take supplementary lessons. She has to reprimand Gō whenever he's about to reveal that he's a Drive Head driver.

A mechanic. He assists with the Synchro Fusion for the Drive Heads and Support Vehicles via remote-control.

A mechanic. He provides support from inside the Transporter.

An operator.

The Mobile Rescue Police chief. He has full authority over the Drive Head project.

Mobile Assault Police 

A young man who is the driver of the S.I.B. Max. He is a rare prodigy. He was initially pursuing the wanted criminal, Dr. Karigari. He later begins to investigate the Black Chips and the mysterious android, TF-3. He knows the identities of the other drivers, and takes an interest in them because of their courage. He has cooperated with them during various major disasters and incidents. During the events of the movie, he becomes the driver of a new unit, the C.I.B. Max. He is forced to destroy the S.I.B. Max, which was taken over by Terra.

Other Major Characters 

The school idol of Takatomi Elementary, which Gō and the other drivers attend. She ridicules Gō for his behavior, such as frequently leaving class for bathroom breaks (which is actually an excuse so he can launch). She admires the driver of Sonic Interceptor, but believes him to be someone tall and handsome and doesn't realize that it's Gō. On one occasion, because some functions at the Mobile Rescue Police headquarters weren't working properly, she accidentally entered the base through the shooter in the school gym, while following Gō. Although Kasumi hoped she could meet the driver of Interceptor, she passed out due to being sick, and was later told that the incident was a dream, although she still believed it was real. This is helped by the fact that she met the dog Axel both inside and outside of the base.

Gō's homeroom teacher. She doesn't know that Gō and the others are drivers.

An announcer who works for the station Akasaka TV (abbreviated as AKTV.) She is modeled after a real-life TV announcer, but is a fictionalized version. She is a huge fan of Drive Head who always arrives first at the scene of a disaster to report on their actions, and hosts various other TV programs. She has faith in Dr. Karigari, who is a wanted criminal but has saved her life.

/ 

A mad scientist who is a self-proclaimed "Genius Scientist". He has a deep amount of self-pride. Along with his subordinates Yūsuke and Akira, he instigates various disasters and incidents against the Mobile Rescue Police. He has a one-sided rivalry with Jō Kurumada and Takahito Saionji, because in the past he once developed a robot for disaster aide, but his project was rejected in favor of the Drive Head project due to safety issues. Although he is obsessed with revenge he doesn't believe in harming outsiders. He is a passionate fan of Sasagawa, loves to watch her Fortune Corner and has saved her from danger. He later opposes the Evil AI and assists the Mobile Rescue Police, using a machine equipped with his personal driving system.

A bank robber whom Gō arrests in the first episode. He is actually Dr. Karigari's faithful subordinate. He is a skilled Walker Vehicle driver.

A bank robber whom Gō arrests in the first episode. He is actually Dr. Karigari's faithful subordinate. He adores his "bro", Yūsuke.

.
A mysterious AI that lurks in various computers. It creates all sorts of disasters. When it invades a machine, the shape of an eyeball appears on-screen. It also causes disasters using Black Chips. Not only can it influence machines, but human emotions, as proven when it caused Isurugi and Izawa to rampage. Eventually, it begins to turn humans into metal. It is made of negative human emotions and capable of self-evolving. Its ultimate goal is to wipe out humanity. In the web series, it gains a new body. This body was originally a completely self-functioning android called TF-3, which was constructed for a terraforming project. The Evil AI took it over after being defeated in battle against the Drive Heads, and it took the name, “Terra”. In the movie, it evolves again to an adult form, and attempts to restructure the earth in order to wipe out all life. It is finally defeated by Gō.

Minor Characters 

Gō's friend.

Gō's friend.

Kasumi's friend.

Kasumi's friend.

An American movie director. He has many exotic pets.

An idol who wears a salamander suit. Although she keeps her real face a secret, Jin accidentally saw it when rescuing her from a disaster. She has been a fan of White Hope ever since this incident.

A thief who infiltrated a motor show. She stole a car with a self-driving AI called Idaten. Later, she copied Idaten for herself, who serves as a companion. Maiko unknowingly assisted the Evil AI in resurrecting, when she planted a Black Chip in the Mobile Rescue Police Headquarters in exchange for pay.

The AI of a self-driving car. Idaten was developed by Mikoshiba. He becomes the partner of Maiko.

Idaten's developer.

Mother of Gō and wife of Jō. She and her husband share a very affectionate relationship. She is aware of the identities of the drivers.

Arisa's grandmother.

An announcer who works for Akasaka TV. She is Sasagawa's junior, who serves as a pinch hitter. Like Sasagawa, she is modeled off of a real-life announcer.

Mecha

Drive Heads 

Driven by Gō Kurumada. Debuts in episode 1. It has a police car motif.
Synchro Fusions- Sonic Interceptor Jet Burnern (Fusion with Sonic Jet)

Driven by Gō Kurumada. Debuts in episode 13. It has a police car motif.
Synchro Fusions- Cyclone Interceptor Mach Shooting Star (Fusion with Blitz Formula), Cyclone Interceptor Jet Striker (Fusion with Blitz Jet Fighter)

Driven by Taiga Yagura. Debuts in episode 3. It has a fire truck motif.
Synchro Fusions- Rescue Backdraft Booster Cannon (Fusion with Fire Truck), Rescue Backdraft Heavy Blade Stronger (Fusion with Rescue Bull Chainsaw)

Driven by Taiga Yagura. Debuts in episode 23. It has a fire truck motif.
Synchro Fusions- Brave Backdraft Rescue Commander (Fusion with Transporter Gaia)

Driven by Taiga Yagura. Debuts in episode 3 of the ONA. It has a fire truck motif.
Synchro Fusions- Master Backdraft Jet Striker (Fusion with Brave Jet Fighter)

Driven by Jin and Mikoto Ishino. Debuts in episode 3. It has an ambulance motif. White Hope has two separate Vipers, and its appearance differs based on which driver is inside.
Synchro Fusions- White Hope Thruster Emperor (Fusion with Rescue Helicopter), White Hope Heavy Blade Stronger (Fusion with Rescue Bull Chainsaw)

Driven by Jin and Mikoto Ishino. Debuts in episode 22. It has an ambulance motif. During the ONA, Jin becomes its sole driver.
Synchro Fusions- White Crystal Hope Rescue Commander (Fusion with Transporter Gaia)

Driven by Mikoto Ishino. Debuts in episode 6 of the ONA. It has an ambulance motif. 
Synchro Fusions- White Pearl Hope Armored Emperor (Fusion with Rescue Active Offroader), White Pearl Hope Armored Thruster Emperor (Fusion with Rescue Active Offroader and Rescue Helicopter)

Driven by Shun Kuroeda. Debuts in episode 19. A black variant of Sonic Interceptor. It belongs to the Mobile Assault Police.
Synchro Fusions- S.I.B. Mega Max (Fusion with Sonic Jet Eagle and Sonic Doberman John)

Driven by Shun Kuroeda. Debuts in the movie. A black variant of Cyclone Interceptor. It belongs to the Mobile Assault Police.

Fake Drive Head 01
A fake Drive Head largely based on Sonic Interceptor, created by the Evil AI.

Fake Drive Head 02
A fake Drive Head largely based on Rescue Backdraft, created by the Evil AI.

Fake Drive Head 03
A fake Drive Head largely based on Mikoto's White Hope, originally created by the Evil AI. Karigari customized it with his own system and drives it. This custom version is only used in the final episode. It has no official name.

Support Vehicles

Media

Anime
Drive Head's TV anime ran for 37 episodes. It was followed up by a monthly web-series, with shorter-length episodes, beginning January 20, 2018. Following the web series is an anime film in August 2018.

List of Episodes

Music
Opening themes
   
 Performance: SUPER★DRAGON  
 Episodes: 1–25 and the web series 
   
 Performance: Satori Boys Club 
 Episodes: 26–37

Ending themes
  
 Performance: SECRET GUYZ
 Episodes: 1–12
  
 Performance: Sakura Shimeji
 Episodes: 13–25
  
 Performance: EBiSSH
 Episodes: 26–37
Movie theme 
 "Go!!!"
 Performance: EBiSSH

References

External links
 Official website 
 
 
 

Takara Tomy franchises
Transforming toy robots
2017 anime television series debuts
2018 anime ONAs
Japanese children's animated science fiction television series
Mecha anime and manga